Pedro Lima may refer to:

 Pedro Lima (actor) (born 1971), former Olympic swimmer and now actor from Angola
 Pedro Lima (boxer) (born 1983), Brazilian boxer